KJXX (1170 AM) is a radio station licensed to Jackson, Missouri.  The station broadcasts a rhythmic hot AC format. The station is owned by Dana Withers' Withers Broadcasting, with the broadcast license being held by Withers Broadcasting Company of Missouri, LLC. KJXX is also heard on 101.9 FM through a translator in Cape Girardeau, Missouri.

On January 1, 2021, KJXX changed their format from Christian talk and adult standards to rhythmic hot adult contemporary, branded as "101.9 The Block".

Translator

Previous logo

References

External links
KJXX online

JXX
Rhythmic adult contemporary radio stations